The Răcătău is a left tributary of the river Siret in Romania. It discharges into the Siret in Răcătău de Jos.

References

Rivers of Romania
Rivers of Bacău County